Oy Wasawings Ab was an airline based in Finland which was operational from 1981 to 1988.

History
The airline got its permission to fly in November 1981 from the Civil Aviation Administration of Finland. After that this permission was extended to also include taxi and charter flights by 1982 to 1983. In December 1983 Wasawings started regular light route traffic between Ilmajoki and Helsinki-Vantaa. It flew from Helsinki to Ylivieska in 1985. After that many reclamations of the company operation was received from customers and staff. The company had a poor security culture and airline captains were forced to shift numbers in flight logs. The company's main owners were the chairman Veikko Tuutti and certain companies from Ostrobothnia. Also it had numerous small-part investors. Wasa Wings had 13,000 passengers in 1987 and 14,600 passengers in 1988.

Accidents and incidents
On August 31, 1986 its Cessna 404 Titan (OH-CIG) crashed into a power line which ran along the edge of the Ylivieska airport. The plane cut trees over 150 meters and then caught fire. 
The company lost its flying licence when a second crash which killed 6 people on November 14, 1988 in Ilmajoki for its Embraer 110 EMB-P1 Bandeirante (OH-EBA, built in 1979 and leased from Kar-Air).

Fleet
In addition to Embraer and Cessna 404, the company had two Beech 99 aircraft.

References

Lappalainen, Tuomo. Kuinka kauan tämä yhtiö saa lentää? Suomen Kuvalehti. 1988-11-18, n:o 46, s. 61. Helsinki: Yhtyneet Kuvalehdet Oy. .
Onnettomuustutkintaselostus, basic facts in 2.1.1.—2.1.7
http://baaa-acro.com/Immatriculations/OH%20-%20Finlande.htm
http://vfinn.fsnordic.net/vwings/0303/5.php
Picture of the crashed aircraft
Airliners.net photos 1
Airliners.net photos 2
Airliners.net photos 3

Defunct airlines of Finland
Airlines established in 1981
Airlines disestablished in 1988
1981 establishments in Finland
1988 disestablishments in Finland
Finnish companies established in 1981